Ochiul Roș is a commune in the Anenii Noi District of Moldova. It is composed of two villages, Ochiul Roș and Picus.

References

Communes of Anenii Noi District